Kenyatta Cornelius Lucas (born January 23, 1979) is a former American football cornerback. He was drafted by the Seahawks in the second round of the 2001 NFL Draft. He played college football at Mississippi. In 2004 he was the NFC co-leader in interceptions.

Lucas has also played for the Carolina Panthers.

Early years
Lucas attended East Side High School in Cleveland, Mississippi, where he garnered first-team all-district honors at wide receiver and kick returner and all-county recognition at wide receiver and cornerback playing alongside former Seattle Seahawks offensive lineman Floyd "Pork Chop" Womack. He was selected the district rookie of the year as a freshman and named the team's most outstanding player as a junior and most valuable player as a senior. Lucas also lettered four times in baseball, finishing with a .395 career batting average. He graduated from East Side in 1997.

College career
Lucas began playing at the University of Mississippi as a wide receiver before moving to defensive back late in his sophomore season. He finished his college career with 87 tackles, seven interceptions and 33 passes defensed on defense; in addition, he totaled 23 catches for 292 yards and one touchdown and four carries for 73 yards on offense. Lucas returned 20 kickoffs for 383 yards and one punt for 17 yards, had nine tackles and blocked two punts on special teams.

Professional career

First stint with Seahawks
Lucas was drafted by the Seattle Seahawks in the second round of the 2001 NFL Draft. He started in his first game as a rookie against the Cleveland Browns, managing to deflect a crucial late game pass that allowed Seattle to preserve their lead and win the game. Lucas would go on to continue his defensive prowess by recording his first NFL interception against the esteemed San Diego Chargers' quarterback, Doug Flutie.

During the 2002 NFL season, Lucas earned nationwide attention after recording two interceptions against Atlanta Falcons quarterback Michael Vick, earning him the NFL's "NFC Defensive Player of the Week" award. After an impressive display of athletic ability, Lucas finished the season with a career-high 82 tackles.

During the 2004 NFL season, Lucas again earned the title of "NFC Defensive Player of the Week" after recording two interceptions against St. Louis Rams' quarterback Marc Bulger. He would finish the season with six interceptions, including one which was returned for his first NFL touchdown.

Carolina Panthers
Lucas was signed by the Panthers prior to the 2005 NFL season as an unrestricted free agent. He started fifteen games in his first season with the Panthers, and once more closed the season with six interceptions. Lucas would continue his superb work in the playoffs, recording two interceptions in three games, although he ended that season with a loss in the NFC Championship against his old team, the eventual 2005 NFC Champion Seattle Seahawks. During training camp for the 2008 season, Lucas was involved in an altercation with Panthers star receiver Steve Smith. Smith blackened Lucas' eye and broke his nose during the scuffle. Ken Lucas was praised by numerous people for forgiving Smith completely.

Lucas was released by the Panthers on March 11, 2009 to clear about $2.3 million in salary cap space.

Second stint with Seahawks
After four seasons in Carolina, Lucas re-signed with the Seattle Seahawks on April 27, 2009.

References

External links
Seattle Seahawks bio

1979 births
Living people
People from Cleveland, Mississippi
American football wide receivers
American football cornerbacks
Ole Miss Rebels football players
Seattle Seahawks players
Carolina Panthers players